The Saluda River is a principal tributary of the Congaree River, about 200 mi (320 km) long, in northern and western South Carolina in the United States.  Via the Congaree River, it is part of the watershed of the Santee River, which flows to the Atlantic Ocean.

Course
The Saluda River is formed about 10 mi (15 km) northwest of the city of Greenville, on the common boundary of Greenville and Pickens Counties, by the confluence of its north and south forks, each of which rises in the Blue Ridge Mountains very near the border of North Carolina at Saluda, North Carolina:
The North Saluda River flows generally south-southwestwardly through northern Greenville County, past Marietta.
The South Saluda River flows generally southeastwardly on the Greenville-Pickens County border, receiving the Oolenoy River and the Middle Saluda River, which rises in Jones Gap State Park and flows generally southward through northwestern Greenville County.

From this confluence the Saluda River flows generally southeastwardly through the Piedmont region, through or along the boundaries of Pickens, Greenville, Anderson, Abbeville, Laurens, Greenwood, Newberry, Saluda, Lexington and Richland Counties, past the towns of Piedmont, West Pelzer, Pelzer, Ware Shoals and West Columbia.  It joins the Broad River in Columbia to form the Congaree River.

Dams
Dams on the Saluda include:
The uppermost dam on the Saluda River, on the border of Greenville and Pickens Counties, forming Saluda Lake
Lake Saluda Reservoir Dam near Berea.
the old textile mill dam in Piedmont
The textile mill dam at Pelzer
The Pelzer Mills Dam, near Williamston
The Lee Steam Plant Dam near Williamston
The Holiday Dam near Belton
a still-operating dam built to power the textile mill in Ware Shoals
Greenwood dam, creating Lake Greenwood
Dreher Shoals Dam creating Lake Murray

Principal tributaries
The Reedy River flows into Lake Greenwood from the north in Laurens County.
The Little River flows into the Saluda from the north in Newberry County.
The Bush River flows into Lake Murray from the north in Newberry County.
The Little Saluda River flows into Lake Murray from the south in Saluda County; it is formed at the town of Saluda by the confluence of Mine Creek and Red Bank Creek.

Crossings
As it travels downstream, the Saluda river is crossed several times.  (Note: this list may at times be incomplete)
Greenville County/Pickens County/Anderson County
Old Hunts Bridge Road
SC 183/Farrs Bridge Road
Saluda Dam Road
SC 124/Old Easley Highway
New Easley Highway (U.S. 123)
Old Easley Bridge Road
Anderson Road (Old Dunham Bridge - SC 81) Powdersville/Greenville
Frontage Road
Interstate 85
SC 153
Anderson Street in Piedmont, South Carolina (SC 86)
Piedmont Highway (SC 20) in Pelzer, South Carolina
SC 8 in Pelzer
Lee Steam Plant Road
Cooley Bridge Road in Belton, South Carolina
Holiday Dam Road
US 76 in Honea Path, South Carolina
Laurens County/Abbeville County/Greenwood County
Erwin Mill Road
Maddox Bridge Road
SC 252 (Old Bridge) in Ware Shoals, South Carolina
East Main Street in Ware Shoals
US 25 in Ware Shoals
Lake Greenwood
Old Laurens-Greenwood Highway
Greenwood Highway (SC 72/US 221) in Lake Shores, South Carolina
Newberry County/Saluda County
Ninety-Six Highway (SC 34)
SC 39 in Chappells, South Carolina
Newberry Highway (SC 121)
Lake Murray
Kempson Bridge Road (SC 395)
SC 391 near Prosperity, South Carolina (also crosses the Little Saluda River)
Dreher Shoals Dam (SC 6)
Columbia/West Columbia 
Interstate 20
Interstate 26
Riverbanks Zoo (footbridge)

Variant names
According to the Geographic Names Information System, the Saluda River has also been known as:
Chickawa
Corn River
Saludy River
Saluta River
Salutah River
Santee River
Seleuda River
The river is named after an Indian tribe that once lived along its banks near the community of Chappells, South Carolina.

Save Our Saluda
In 2008, a collective of local citizens (or Citizens Action Group) based in Marietta, Greenville County, South Carolina initiated a campaign to "Save Our Saluda" following what they perceived to be aggressive property development. Their mission is to "(protect) and (preserve) the headwaters of the Saluda watershed through concerned citizens action".

Endangered Status
In April 2009, the Saluda River was named by American Rivers, a leading river conservation group to a list of rivers in the United States that are under imminent threat by dams, industry or development. The article, posted on CNN on April 7, 2009 stated "Excess levels of sewage waste threaten the drinking water of more than 500,000 South Carolina residents, conservationists say. Sewage in the river increases phosphorus and algae levels, depletes oxygen, and kills fish and other aquatic life. American Rivers is asking the South Carolina Department of Health and Environmental Control to improve sewage-treatment standards and ensure the river reduces its phosphorus levels by 25 to 50 percent."

See also
List of South Carolina rivers

Sources
Columbia Gazetteer of North America entry
DeLorme (1998).  South Carolina Atlas & Gazetteer.  Yarmouth, Maine: DeLorme.  .

SC DNR Middle Saluda River
Save Our Saluda website

Rivers of South Carolina
Geography of Columbia, South Carolina
Rivers of Abbeville County, South Carolina
Rivers of Anderson County, South Carolina
Rivers of Greenville County, South Carolina
Rivers of Greenwood County, South Carolina
Rivers of Laurens County, South Carolina
Rivers of Lexington County, South Carolina
Rivers of Pickens County, South Carolina
Rivers of Richland County, South Carolina
Rivers of Saluda County, South Carolina
Tributaries of the Santee River